Trixie Motel is an American reality television series that follows Trixie Mattel (the stage name of drag queen Brian Firkus) and her partner David Silver as they buy and renovate a rundown motel in Palm Springs, California.

Background
Mattel based the aesthetics of the motel on her drag character, her web series UNHhhh with Katya Zamolodchikova, and her beauty brand Trixie Cosmetics, among other inspirations. The location was originally named Ruby Montana's Coral Sands Inn; Mattel had originally planned to transform it into an AirBnB to rent out but changed her mind after viewing the property. According to Mattel she spent around $1.9 million to purchase the space and $500,000 to renovate it, enlisting designer Dani Dazey to collaborate on the project.

Cast

Main
Trixie Mattel, drag queen, comedian, singer and co-owner of the motel
David Silver, film and television producer, Trixie's boyfriend and co-owner of the motel
Brandon Lim, Trixie's assistant
Dani Dazey, the motel renovation's interior designer
David Rios, the motel renovation's project manager

Special guests
Celebrity guests appear throughout the series to assist the owners and give them advice on how to renovate their property.

Episode 1, "Pink Flamingo" 
Lisa Vanderpump, restaurateur and television personality
Old Gays, social media personalities
Andrew and Nicole Norman of Mojo Glassworks

Episode 2, "Queen of Hearts" 
Nicole Byer, actress and comedian
Mo Heart, drag queen
Nicholas Scheppard and Jenson Titus of Very Gay Paint
Vania Nasution and Jessica Stevens of Trixie Cosmetics

Episode 3, "Yeehaw Cowgirl" 
Orville Peck, country singer
Brittany Broski, internet personality

Episode 4, "Atomic Bombshell" 
Jaida Essence Hall, drag queen
Juno Birch, drag queen
George Schneider, co-owner of This Is It!
Val Zlomaniec, Trixie's mother
Samantha Zlomaniec, Trixie's sister
Nicholas Scheppard and Jenson Titus of Very Gay Paint
Christy Holstege, Mayor of Palm Springs

Episode 5, "Flower Power" 
Jonathan Scott, television personality and producer
Zooey Deschanel, actress and singer
Iggy Azalea, rapper and model

Episode 6, "Malibu Barbara" 
Leslie Jordan, actor and writer
Belinda Carlisle, musician
Ashley Levy, songwriter and record producer
Tomas Costanza, songwriter and record producer

Episode 7, "Oh Honeymoon" 
Gigi Gorgeous, internet personality, actress and model
Jonathan Bennett, actor and TV host
James Vaughan, actor and TV host

Episode 8, "Pride Grand Opening" 
Jaymes Mansfield, drag queen
Emily Hampshire, actress
Juno Birch, drag queen
Katya Zamolodchikova, drag queen
Monét X Change, drag queen
Fena Barbitall, drag queen
Bob the Drag Queen, drag queen
Manila Luzon, drag queen
Kim Chi, drag queen
Alaska Thunderfuck, drag queen
Brooke Lynn Hytes, drag queen
Nicholas Scheppard and Jenson Titus of Very Gay Paint

Episodes

Promotion
The trailer for the series was released via YouTube on May 4, 2022, featuring Mattel's song "Stay the Night" from her fourth studio album The Blonde & Pink Albums, which was also used as the series' opening theme; Mattel said that she wrote the song with the series in mind before a television deal had been struck. Shortly after the series' premiere Discovery+ published ten-minute sneak peek clips of the beginnings of the first two episodes via their YouTube channel. Trixie has also used part of the first episode as her opening act during her "Grown Up" tour to help promote the series.

Reception

Accolades

References

External links 

 Trixie Motel at IMDb

2022 in LGBT history
2022 American television series debuts
Drag (clothing) television shows
2020s American LGBT-related television series
2020s American reality television series
2020s LGBT-related reality television series
Television shows set in Palm Springs, California
2022 American television series endings